Julius Petraitis (born 1905, date of death unknown) was a Lithuanian long-distance runner. He competed in the men's 5000 metres at the 1928 Summer Olympics.

References

1905 births
Year of death missing
Athletes (track and field) at the 1928 Summer Olympics
Lithuanian male long-distance runners
Olympic athletes of Lithuania
Place of birth missing